The following is a list notable Australian netball international players who have represented the national team in international tournaments such as the Commonwealth Games, the Netball World Cup, the World Games, the Constellation Cup, the Netball Quad Series and in other senior test matches.

Most-capped internationals

Sport Australia Hall of Fame

Individuals
The following Australian netball international players have been inducted into the Sport Australia Hall of Fame.

Team Sport Australia Award
Three World Netball Championships winning Australia national netball teams have been inducted into the Sport Australia Hall of Fame.

1963 World Champions
The following Australian netball internationals were members of the squad that won the 1963 World Netball Championships.  In 2005 they were also inducted into the Sport Australia Hall of Fame.

1991 World Champions
The following Australian netball internationals were members of the squad that won the 1991 World Netball Championships. In 1992 all the players and their head coach, Joyce Brown, were awarded the Medal of the Order of Australia. In 2012 they were also inducted into the Sport Australia Hall of Fame.

1999 World Champions
The following Australian netball internationals were members of the squad that won the 1999 World Netball Championships. In 2014 they were also inducted into the Sport Australia Hall of Fame.

Australian Netball Awards

Liz Ellis Diamond
In 2008 Netball Australia introduced the Liz Ellis Diamond award in honour of Liz Ellis. It was awarded to the best performing Australian international, based on their performances with both the national team and in the ANZ Championship. Since 2017, it has been awarded to Suncorp Super Netball players.

Australian International Player of the Year

Australian Netball Hall of Fame
The following Australian netball international players have been inducted into Australian Netball Hall of Fame.

Gallery

References

 
Australian internationals
Netball internationals
Internationals